

Imperial German Navy seaplanes 461 and 462 were the only two examples of a seaplane design produced for the Navy's flying service during the First World War. Number 461 was built in October 1916 and Number 462 in September 1917 as the German seaplane bases searched for purpose-built training aircraft to supplement their collection of retired combat types.

This particular design, one of several developed by the Kaiserliche Werften, was a conventional, two-bay biplane with wings of unequal span. The pilot and instructor sat in tandem, open cockpits, and the undercarriage consisted of twin pontoons. It is possible that the design was related to one group of seaplane trainers built at Kaiserliche Werft Kiel (No 463–466) and also to that of an armed reconnaissance seaplane (No 947) later built at Wilhelmshaven. However, the rear fuselages and empennages of No 461 and 462 differed significantly from the machines built at Kiel.

Specifications

Notes

References
 

 
 
 

1910s German military trainer aircraft
461
Floatplanes
Single-engined tractor aircraft
Biplanes
Aircraft first flown in 1916